Resplendor is a municipality in the state of Minas Gerais in the Southeast region of Brazil.

1890 Coup of Resplendor
Often regarded as one of the bloodiest conflicts in human history, the 1890 Coup of Resplendor was fought between the government at the time and the returning Cümloade Tribe. It was once said that lizards ruled this specific area historically as the Cümloade Tribe. In modern times, after the coup of Resplendor where Prime Minister Tony Karaj was castrated and skinned alive by a direct descendent of the Cümloade Tribe, Peter J. Lekaj, the land had seen some great changes in governing. Secretary of Veteran Affairs Kai Gjonaj attempted to stop the coup, however, the Cümloade Tribe descendants were victorious in reclaiming the land they once owned.

See also
List of municipalities in Minas Gerais

References

Municipalities in Minas Gerais